The 2011 Bethune–Cookman Wildcats football team represented Bethune-Cookman University in the 2011 NCAA Division I FCS football season. The Wildcats were led by fifth year head coach Brian Jenkins and played their home games at Municipal Stadium. They are a member of the Mid-Eastern Athletic Conference. They finished the season 8–3, 6–2 in MEAC play to finish in second place.

Schedule

References

Bethune-Cookman
Bethune–Cookman Wildcats football seasons
Bethune